Anna Hill Johnstone (April 7, 1913 – October 16, 1992) was an American costume designer. Known for her collaborations with directors Elia Kazan, Sidney Lumet and Frank Perry, she received two Academy Award nominations for her work on The Godfather (1972) and Ragtime (1981).

Johnstone's credits include East of Eden (1955), Baby Doll (1956), David and Lisa (1962), The Group (1966), The Godfather (1972), The Taking of Pelham One Two Three (1974), The Stepford Wives (1975), Dog Day Afternoon (1975), and Running on Empty (1988).

Early life 
Johnstone was born in Greenville, South Carolina, and grew up in Richmond, Virginia. In 1934, she graduated from Barnard College.

Career
Johnstone got her start working on student productions at Barnard College, later becoming a seamstress for summer stock stage shows. Her first full credit for costume design was for the 1937 Broadway hit Having Wonderful Time. Her other stage productions included Bell, Book and Candle, Tea and Sympathy, and A Streetcar Named Desire.

In 1948, Johnstone made the move to working in films, obtaining her first costume design credit on Portrait of Jennie. She has been nominated for an Oscar twice for her work in costume design.

Personal life 
Johnstone was married to mechanical engineer Curville Jones Robinson from 1937 until his death in 1989.

Death 
Johnstone died on October 19, 1992 in a nursing home in Lenox, Massachusetts, after a long illness. She was 79 years old.

Selected filmography

Awards and nominations

References

External links 
 

1913 births
1992 deaths
American costume designers
Barnard College alumni
People from Greenville, South Carolina
People from Richmond, Virginia
Women costume designers